Stephen D. Cox (born January 12, 1948) is the editor of Liberty magazine, an American online libertarian and classical liberal review. He is also an emeritus professor of literature at the University of California, San Diego and author of several non-fiction books.

Career
After receiving his PhD from the University of California, Los Angeles, Cox joined the faculty of UC San Diego in 1976.

He was an associate editor of Liberty when the magazine began publishing in 1987. He was named as senior editor as of the March 1989 issue. Cox took over as editor-in-chief of the publication following the death of its founder and longtime editor and publisher, R. W. Bradford, in December 2005. In addition to editing duties, he writes articles and commentary for the magazine. This includes his monthly "WordWatch" column, in which he comments on how language and semantics influence culture and political discourse.

Reception
Publishers Weekly called his 2009 book The Big House: Image and Reality of the American Prison "detailed and vivid". In The Historian, Matthew J. Mancini said Cox provided "a jolt of nonpartisan realism" about the prison as a cultural institution, but faulted him for not including discussion of modern novels about prison life. The book was also reviewed in Choice and The Chronicle of Higher Education.

His 2014 book American Christianity: The Continuing Revolution was described by Library Journal as a "fascinating, pleasurable read". In Church History, Barry Hankins called it "provocative" with "some highly insightful observations about the ironies of American Christianity". The book was also reviewed in Choice, Kirkus Reviews, and Touchstone.

Background and personal life
On his website, Cox indicates he is from rural Michigan. He received his BA degree from the University of Michigan.

Selected works

References

External links
 Stephen D. Cox personal website
 Faculty profile at UC San Diego
 

1948 births
Living people
Place of birth missing (living people)
American academics of English literature
American libertarians
American male non-fiction writers
American magazine editors
American political writers
University of California, San Diego faculty
University of Michigan alumni
University of California, Los Angeles alumni
Gay academics
Academics from Michigan